Austin Wright (1922 – 2003) was a novelist, literary critic and professor emeritus of English.

Austin Wright may also refer to:
 Austin Andrew Wright, British sculptor
Austin Tappan Wright